The Ministry of Finance (FIN) is the Dutch Ministry responsible for economic policy, monetary policy, fiscal policy, tax policy, incomes policy, financial regulation, the government budget and the financial market. The Ministry was created in 1798 as the Department of Finance of the Batavian Republic. It became the Ministry of Finance in 1876. The Minister of Finance is the head of the Ministry and a member of the Cabinet of the Netherlands. The current Minister is Sigrid Kaag.

History
The ministry was founded in 1798. In the early history of the ministry, the Prime Minister often served as Minister of Finance. Pieter Philip van Bosse served as Minister of Finance five times. Since 1965 a State Secretary has been appointed each formation with responsibility for taxation. The most recent Prime Minister to serve as his own Minister of Finance was Jelle Zijlstra (1966–67).

Responsibilities
The ministry has the duty to "guard the treasury and aim for a financially sound and prosperous state of the Netherlands.
 It is responsible for the income and expenditure of the Kingdom of the Netherlands.
 It collects the taxes and develops fiscal legislation.
 It seeks to expend the budget of the government responsibly, efficiently and effectively.
 It is also responsible for financial-economic policy.
 It supervises the financial markets, banks and financial transfers.

Organisation
The ministry is currently headed by one minister and one State secretary. The ministry's main office is located in the centre of The Hague at the Korte Voorhout. It employs almost 1,500 civil servants. The civil service is headed by a secretary general and a deputy secretary general, who head a system of four directorates general:
 General Treasury (financial economic policy), led by the Treasurer-General
 Agency of the General Treasury
 Directorate Financing
 Directorate Financial Markets
 Directorate Foreign Financial Relations
 Directorate General for the Budget
 Directorate Budget Affairs
 Inspection of National Finances
 Directorate General for Fiscal Affairs
 Directorate General Fiscal Policy
 Directorate Taxation Management
 Directorate International Affairs and Excise Tax
 Directorate General for Taxation

It is also responsible for several decentralized services:
 The agency in Amsterdam
 The Tax and Customs Administration, the Dutch revenue service, which includes the customs service and the fiscal policy
 Service for State Property
 Netherlands Authority for the Financial Markets (AFM)

Holdings 
A list of all companies (partially owned) by the Dutch government via the Ministry of Finance.

State Holdings 
List of companies of which the Ministry of Finance acts merely as shareholder.

Policy Holdings 
List of policy holdings in which the role of shareholder and policy maker cannot be unbundled from each other. These companies are (partially) owned by the Ministry of Finance and managed by the relevant ministry.

Temporarily financial institutions 
NLFI is the shareholder on behalf of the Dutch Government in the financial institutions that are state-owned as a result of the financial crisis.

See also
 List of Ministers of Finance of the Netherlands

References

External links
  Ministerie van Financiën (Rijksoverheid)

Financial services companies established in 1798
Netherlands
Finance
Ministries established in 1798
1798 establishments in the Batavian Republic
Finance in the Netherlands